Plexus Consulting Group, LLC is a management consulting firm that is specialized in providing market and stakeholder research, strategic planning facilitation, and branding and promotional services to not-for-profit and public service sectors. Plexus is based in Washington, D.C., in the United States and in addition has affiliate offices globally in Abu Dhabi, Amman, Beijing, Brussels, Cape Town, Geneva, London, Mexico City, New Delhi, Paris, Reykjavík, Sao Paulo, Shanghai, Sydney, and Tokyo. The company was formed in 1999 after it spun off a large association management company.

Over the past twelve years Plexus Consulting Group, LLC has worked with over 300 non-profit clients in their strategic planning initiatives. For example, recent projects include a USAID-sponsored Jordan Economic Development Program in which Plexus presented three possible developing scenarios around which strategic plans were developed.

References

External links
 www.plexusconsulting.com

International management consulting firms
Privately held companies based in Washington, D.C.
Consulting firms established in 1999
Management consulting firms of the United States
1999 establishments in Washington, D.C.